San Elizario Independent School District is a public school district based in the community of San Elizario, Texas (USA). The district is in El Paso County and its Superintendent is Dr. Meza-Chavez.

In 2009, the school district was rated "academically acceptable" by the Texas Education Agency.

In 2015, San Elizario High School won the UIL Soccer and three consecutive  Cross Country State Championship title

Schools
San Elizario High (Grades 9-12) Built in 1995
Ann M. Garcia-Enriquez Middle (Grades 7-8) Formally San Elizario High School 1972-1997 
Lorenzo G. Alarcon Elementary (Grades 1-6)
Alfonso Borrego Sr. Elementary (Grades 1-6)
Josefa L. Sambrano Elementary (Grades 1-6)
Lorenzo G. Loya Primary (Grades PK-K)

References

External links
 

School districts in El Paso County, Texas
San Elizario, Texas